Ninemile Creek is a stream in the U.S. state of South Dakota. It is a tributary of Belle Fourche River.

Ninemile Creek was named for its distance,  from Empire.

See also
List of rivers of South Dakota

References

Rivers of Butte County, South Dakota
Rivers of Meade County, South Dakota
Rivers of South Dakota